Al-Shamal SC Stadium is a football stadium in Madinat ash Shamal, Qatar. It is the home venue of Qatar Stars League team Al-Shamal SC. The stadium holds a capacity of 5,000 people.

External links
 StadiumDB photos

References

Sport in Al Shamal
Shamal